The Bayer designation A Aquarii is shared by two stars in the constellation Aquarius:

 A1 Aquarii or 103 Aquarii.
 A2 Aquarii or 104 Aquarii, itself a double star.

See also
α Aquarii (Sadalmelik)

References

Aquarii, A
A Aquarii